Liverpool Kirkdale was a constituency represented in the House of Commons of the Parliament of the United Kingdom covering Kirkdale, Liverpool. It elected one Member of Parliament (MP) by the first past the post system of election.

Boundaries
1885–1918: The parish of Kirkdale, and part of the parish of Everton.

1918–1950: The County Borough of Liverpool wards of Kirkdale and St Domingo.

1950–1955: The County Borough of Liverpool wards of Anfield, Breckfield, and Kirkdale.

1955–1974: The County Borough of Liverpool wards of Anfield, Breckfield, Melrose, Tuebrook, and Westminster.

1974–1983: The County Borough of Liverpool wards of Anfield, Breckfield, Melrose, St Domingo, Tuebrook, and Westminster.

Members of Parliament

Election results 1885–1918

Elections in the 1880s

Elections in the 1890s

Baden-Powell's death caused a by-election.

Elections in the 1900s

Elections in the 1910s

Elections 1918–1945

Elections in the 1910s

Elections in the 1920s

Elections in the 1930s 

General Election 1939–40

Another General Election was required to take place before the end of 1940. The political parties had been making preparations for an election to take place and by the Autumn of 1939, the following candidates had been selected;
Conservative: Robert Rankin
Labour: John Hamilton
Liverpool Protestant Party: Henry Dixon Longbottom

Elections in the 1940s

Elections 1950–1979

Elections in the 1950s

Elections in the 1960s

Elections in the 1970s

References

Kirkdale constituency
Constituencies of the Parliament of the United Kingdom established in 1885
Constituencies of the Parliament of the United Kingdom disestablished in 1983